Arcane Rain Fell is the second full-length album released by the band Draconian through Napalm Records on 24 January 2005. It was recorded and produced at Studio Underground.

The album is a concept album that details the fall of Lucifer from Heaven and the creation of Hell, featuring slow guitar riffs, soprano vocals, keyboards/piano, violins, cellos and growling vocals. All guitars on the album were performed by Johan Ericson.

"Death, Come Near Me" is a remake of a song off of the 2002 "Dark Oceans We Cry" demo.  "The Apostasy Canticle" was originally titled "The Wings of God".

Track listing

Personnel
Anders Jacobsson - vocals
Lisa Johansson - vocals
Johan Ericson - guitars, backing vocals
Jerry Torstensson - drums, percussion
Andreas Karlsson - keyboards, programming
Jesper Stolpe - bass

Additional personnel
Ryan Henry - narrative lines in some songs, full narration on "Expostulation"
Peter in de Betou - mastering
Pelle Saether - producer, engineering
Madeleine Engström - photography
Travis Smith - cover art, layout

References

2005 albums
Death-doom albums
Draconian (band) albums
Napalm Records albums
Albums with cover art by Travis Smith (artist)